Léal Bluff is a rounded bluff rising to ,  inland from Cape Lamb in the southwest part of Vega Island, Antarctica. It was named by the Argentine Antarctic Expedition after Mayor Jorge Léal, deputy leader at Esperanza Station in 1947.

References

Cliffs of the James Ross Island group